Ana Lorena Ibáñez Carles (born 1986 in Penonomé, Coclé, Panama) is a Panamanian model and beauty pageant contestant winner of the Miss Earth Panamá 2012 title on March 30, 2012, for Miss Earth 2012 contest.

Early life
Born in Penonomé, Ibáñez Carles is a Model who began his career with participation in Chico y Chica Modelo, is also sister of the first runner-up Señorita Panamá 2004 pageant Ana Isabel Ibáñez Carles. She is Bachelor of Business Administration with emphasis in Marketing degree from the Universidada Latina de Panama.

Miss Panamá 2012

Ibáñez competed in the national beauty pageant Miss Panamá 2012.

Reina Hispanoamericana 2012
She represented Panama in the Reina Hispanoamericana 2012 beauty pageant held in Bolivia on October 25, 2012. She place in the top 7 and won the Best National Costume Award.

Miss Earth

She represent Panamá in the Miss Earth 2012 pageant, held in Philippines in November 2012, but did not place.

See also
 Miss Panamá 2012
 Karen Jordán

References

External links
 Panamá 2012 official website
 Miss Panamá

1986 births
Living people
People from Penonomé District
Panamanian beauty pageant winners
Panamanian female models
Señorita Panamá
Miss Earth 2012 contestants